Eastern Suburbs District Rugby Football Club (now known as the Sydney Roosters) competed in their fourth New South Wales Rugby League season in 1911, winning their maiden premiership.

1911 playing squad

1911 results

Premiership Round 3. 13 May
Glebe Dirty Reds 8 ( Muggivan, L. Cubitt tries;  A.Burge goal ) defeated Eastern Suburbs 0 at Wentworth park. crowd 4000
"Quite the liveliest, contest of the day was that at Wentworth Park, where about 4000 locals cheered the Reds to victory over the redoubtable Eastern Suburbs. It was fast and furious at times. Two men were carried off Injured. Two more were ordered off the field-one for indiscriminate kicking, and one for unnecessarily rough play. Now and then the spectators, worked to a pitch of excitement, started melees of their own. The game itaelf was a triumph for the local forwards, who ran over the opponents, and the Glebe backs, taking advantage of the situation, notched 8 points to nil."

1911 NSWRL ladder

Eastern Suburbs first premiership

Finals campaign
premiership Semi Final, Saturday 2 September 1911. At the Sydney Sports Ground. [1]

premiership Final, 9 September 1911, at the Agricultural Ground.

 premiership Final re-match, Saturday 16 September 1911. [2]

Offence
The lowdown:

Eastern Suburbs completed the following score options in the 1911 season:

 45 tries
 64 goals
 2 field goals

Defence
The lowdown:

Eastern Suburbs conceded the following score options in the 1911 season:

 34 tries
 26 goals
 1 field goals

The result:

Eastern Suburbs conceded a total of 129 points in the 1911 season.

The verdict:

 Eastern Suburbs try scoring defence dropped by 35.2% on their previous season.
 Eastern Suburbs goal kicking defence dropped by 7.6% on their previous season.
 Eastern Suburbs field goal defence was maintained on their previous season.
 Eastern Suburbs overall defense dropped by 10% on their previous season.
 Eastern Suburbs total points against defensive effort improved by 17.7% on their previous season.

1911 season highlights
 Eastern Suburbs won their first premiership defeating the Glebe 11-8 in the Final.
 Won the 1911 reserve grade competition for the fourth year in a row.
 Dally Messenger was the top point scorer in the NSWRL with 148 points.
 Eastern Suburbs were once again the winners of the presidents cup competition.
 Eastern Suburbs players to represent Australia were:- Dan Frawley & Bob Williams
 Eastern Suburbs players to gain selection for that year's Kangaroo Tour were:- Dan Frawley & Bob Williams.
 Eastern Suburbs played their first match at the Sydney Sports Ground.
 Dan Frawley was the first rugby league player to score a try on the Sydney Cricket Ground, Dally Messenger the first to kick a goal.

Notes
 No Semi-final would normally be required under the rules of the day. However, because Eastern Suburbs and South Sydney finished level on points, They played off to see who met the minor premiers Glebe, in the final.
 As minor premiers Glebe had the right of challenge, if beaten. A second final was played one week later.
 While representing NSW in an interstate match against Queensland, Dally Messenger scored a record 32 points, coming from four tries and ten goals. In the 3 match series, Messenger scored a total of 72 points.
 Dan Frawley, while playing in a representative match, became the first rugby league player to score a try on the Sydney Cricket Ground.

References

External links
 Rugby League Tables and Statistics
 Ian Heads, True Blue - the true story of the NSW Rugby League,

Sydney Roosters seasons
East